Lemmaniella is a genus of mites in the family Acaridae.

Species
 Lemmaniella reducta Mahunka, 1977

References

Acaridae